The following is a list of events affecting Philippine television in 2009. Events listed include television show debuts, finales, cancellations, and channel launches, closures and rebrandings, as well as information about controversies and carriage disputes.

Events
 February 1 - DTH satellite TV provider Cignal was officially launched.
 February 9 - ABS-CBN TV-10 Batangas launches TV Patrol Southern Tagalog as the originating station broadcast around Batangas and across Calabarzon, which has been owned by the Regional Network Group.
 May 22 - A victory party for Manny "Pacman" Pacquiao, who just became the new IBO (International Boxing Organization) and Ring Magazine Light Welterweight Champion, was held at the Renaissance Hotel in Makati, in partnership with GMA Network, Inc. Solar and GMA executives at that time signed for a partnership in TV coverage of Manny Pacquiao's upcoming boxing matches.
 July 30 - Eat Bulaga! celebrated its 30th anniversary.
 August 1 - When Cory Aquino died, her death and funeral was given a full scale media coverage.
 August 3 - In the episode of Wowowee, during which the show was interrupted for live coverage of the transfer of President Cory Aquino's remains from La Salle Greenhills to the Manila Cathedral, Revillame said that he could not make people happy while the entire country was mourning. The Alliance of Filipino Journalists denounced his remarks as a sign of disrespect towards Aquino. Revillame said he had no intention of defaming the former president and her family.
 October 3 - Jude Matthew Servilla was hailed as Eat Bulaga!'s Birit Baby 2009 Grand Winner.
 November 29 - Solar rebranded C/S9 as Solar TV at 11:00am with a slogan It's A Bright New World on RPN. On October 31, 2010, it changed some of its programming content to English/Tagalog with a new slogan Kung Saan Lahat Panalo!.
 Unknown - PLDT (under its myDSL brand) launched a livestreaming service to allowed a free binge-watch access on TV channels, PLDT Watchpad.

Premieres

Unknown dates
December: House of Hoops on Solar TV 9

Unknown
Tara! Lets Eat! on Q 11
Word of Mouth on Q 11
Teenage Mutant Ninja Turtles: Fast Forward on ABS-CBN 2
The Millionaire Matchmaker on ETC (SBN 21)
Modern Family on 2nd Avenue (RJTV 29)
Power Rangers Jungle Fury on ABS-CBN 2
Straight to the Point on IBC 13
Health Line on IBC 13
Ultimatum on IBC 13
Signs and Wonders on IBC 13
Mommy Diary on GMA 7
OC to the Max on GMA 7
Ating Alamin on NBN 4
The Middle on 2nd Avenue (RJTV 29)
Hillsong Concert Specials on ZOE TV 33
Stoplight TV on TV5
Front Act on TV5
Nuebe Patrol on ABS-CBN TV-9 Pagadian

Returning or renamed programs

Programs transferring networks

Finales
January 2: Sakurano (GMA 7)
January 8: The Girls of the Playboy Mansion (ETC on SBN 21)
January 14: Snoop Dogg's Father Hood (ETC on SBN 21)
January 15: Beauty and the Geek (ETC on SBN 21)
January 16:
 Moms (Q 11)
 Dyosa (ABS-CBN 2)
 Daisy Siete: Tinderella (GMA 7)
January 25: Pinoy Meets World (GMA 7)
January 30: 
 Why Why Love (ABS-CBN 2)
 Eva Fonda (ABS-CBN 2)
February 5: Rescue Mission (TV5)
February 6: LaLola (GMA 7)
February 13:
 Money War (GMA 7) 
 Wanted Perfect Family (GMA 7)
 Boy & Kris (ABS-CBN 2)
 Pinoy Fear Factor (ABS-CBN 2)
February 15:
 MP3 (TV5)
 You and Me Against the World (TV5)
February 17: Full Force Nature (GMA 7)
February 20: Gagambino (GMA 7)
February 27: Saan Darating ang Umaga? (GMA 7)
March 6:
 Luna Mystika (GMA 7)
 Emergency (GMA 7)
March 11: Masquerade (GMA 7)
March 13: Be Strong, Geum-soon! (GMA 7)
March 20: Love at the Corner (GMA 7)
March 27: Kapamilya, Deal or No Deal (season 3) (ABS-CBN 2)
April 10: Quarterlife (ETC on SBN 21)
April 17:
 Parekoy (ABS-CBN 2)
 Daisy Siete: Tarzariray Amasonang Kikay (GMA 7)
April 24: I Love Betty La Fea (ABS-CBN 2)
May 1:
 Gokusen III (GMA 7)
 Ang Babaeng Hinugot sa Aking Tadyang (GMA 7)
 Pieta (ABS-CBN 2)
May 9: Kakasa Ka Ba sa Grade 5? (season 2) (GMA 7)
May 21: American Idol: Season 8 (Q 11)
May 22:
 Nodame Cantabile (GMA 7)
 Fated To Love You (GMA 7)
May 23: Lovely Day (GMA 7)
May 24: Ultraman Max (ABS-CBN 2)
June 5:
 All About Eve (GMA 7)
 Paano Ba ang Mangarap? (GMA 7)
June 7: Dear Friend: Madrasta (GMA 7)
June 10: Probe (ABS-CBN 2)
June 12: Hot Shot (ABS-CBN 2)
June 19:
 Dapat Ka Bang Mahalin? (GMA 7)
 One Liter of Tears (GMA 7)
June 26: 
 Rosalinda (GMA 7)
 Pinoy Bingo Night (ABS-CBN 2)
July 3: Totoy Bato (GMA 7)
July 12: Jollitown (season 2) (GMA 7)
July 17: Daisy Siete: Kambalilong (GMA 7)
July 19: Transformers: Cybertron (ABS-CBN 2)
August 7: 
 Love or Bread (ABS-CBN 2)
 Zorro (GMA 7)
August 16: Ful Haus (GMA 7)
August 21: 
 Boys Over Flowers (ABS-CBN 2)
 Only You (ABS-CBN 2)
August 23: Are You the Next Big Star? (GMA 7)
August 27: Cruel Love (GMA 7)
August 28: Chil Princesses (GMA 7)
August 29: Lipgloss (TV5)
August 31: Ha Ha Hayop (TV5)
September 3: Philippines Scariest Challenge (TV5)
September 4: LaLola (GMA 7)
September 18: All My Life (GMA 7)
September 25:
 Ngayon at Kailanman (GMA 7)
 Kung Aagawin Mo ang Lahat sa Akin (GMA 7)
 Tayong Dalawa (ABS-CBN 2)
October 3: Games Uplate Live (ABS-CBN 2)
October 5: Kalye, Mga Kwento ng Lansangan (ABS-CBN 2)
October 9: 
Kambal sa Uma (ABS-CBN 2)
Miss No Good (ABS-CBN 2)
October 10: Bitoy's Funniest Videos (GMA 7)
October 11: G&G: Goals & Girls (TV5)
October 16:
 Hole in the Wall (season 1) (GMA 7)
 Daisy Siete: Chacha Muchacha (GMA 7)
October 18:
 All-Star K! (GMA 7)
 AM @ IBC (IBC 13)
October 20: Ranma ½ (TV5)
October 23:
 Pilipinas, Game KNB? (ABS-CBN 2)
 Ruffa & Ai (ABS-CBN 2)
October 24: Wonder Mom (ABS-CBN 2)
October 25: Kay Susan Tayo! (GMA 7)
October 30: Game About Love (GMA 7)
November 6: Last Romance (GMA 7)
November 13: Survivor Philippines: Palau (GMA 7)
November 14: Celebrity Duets (Season 3) (GMA 7)
November 20: Freestyle (GMA 7)
November 27: Rosalinda (GMA 7)
December 2: Project Runway Philippines (season 2) (ETC on SBN 21)
December 6: DoQmentaries (Q 11)
December 11:
 On Air (GMA 7)
 Stairway to Heaven (GMA 7)
 Lovers in Paris (ABS-CBN 2)
December 27: Power of 10 (GMA 7)

Unknown dates
March: Draw the Line (Q 11)

Unknown
 Living It Up (Q 11)
 Chef to Go (Q 11)
 Unlimited Diving (NBN 4)
 Busog Lusog (ABS-CBN 2)
 Pilipinas Sabong Sports (IBC 13)
 Straight to the Point (IBC 13)
 Ating Alamin (IBC 13)
 Camera Café (GMA 7)
 Outrageous and Courageous (GMA 7)
 Mommy Diary (GMA 7)
 Chill Spot (ETC on SBN 21)
 Untamed Beauties (TV5)
 Value Vision (ZOE TV 33)
 All Hot Music (TV5)
 Shock Attack (TV5)
 I Am Ninoy (TV5)
 TV Patrol Northwestern Mindanao (ABS-CBN TV-9 Pagadian)

Ratings

Networks

Launches
 October 1: All Sports Network
 November 29: Solar TV
 November 30: Star Movies Asia

Unknown
 Global Pinoy Cinema

Rebranded
 August 19: Hallmark Channel Asia → Hallmark Channel Philippines

Closures
 July 15: C/S Origin
 November 28: C/S 9

Moving
 November 2: Iglesia Ni Cristo (Channel 22 moved to Channel 136)

Births
February 5: Carren Eistrup, actress and singer
June 23: Xia Vigor, child actress
June 26: Yesha Camile, child actress
July 12: Lilygem Yulores, child actress

Deaths
February 5: Roberto Gonzales, 66, actor best known for martial-arts roles (born 1942)
February 10: Berting Labra, 76, film actor often in comic sidekick roles (born 1932)
February 12: Cris Daluz, 75, character actor (born 1934)
March 6: Francis Magalona, 44, actor, TV host, photographer and rapper and father of actors Elmo Magalona, Frank Magalona, Saab Magalona and Maxene Magalona (born 1964)
March 16: Roland Dantes, 65, martial artist and actor & uncle of actor of Dingdong Dantes (born 1944)
March 18: Pocholo Ramirez, 75, race car driver and television host and grandfather of Myx VJ Janine Ramirez (born 1933)
March 21: Genoveva Matute, 93, writer (born 1915)
April 4: Nelly Sindayen, 59, journalist and Time Magazine correspondent (born 1949)
April 11: Tita Muñoz, film actress (born 1926/1927)
April 16: Trinidad Etong, 44, the wife of Ted Failon (born 1965)
April 27: Paraluman, 85, film actress (born 1923)
June 13: Douglas Quijano, 64, talent manager (born 1944)
July 2: Susan Fernandez, singer and activist (born 1956)
July 28: Emilio Gancayco, 86, former jurist in the Supreme Court and grandfather of teen actress Erich Gonzales (born 1922)
August 10: Tyrone Suarez, 39, former movie actor and model (born 1970)
August 11: Kennely Ann Lacia-Binay a.k.a. Audrey Vizcara, 29, former movie actress and model daughter-in-law of Makati
September 1: Alexis Tioseco, 28, Filipino-born Canadian film critic (born 1981)
September 8: Rogelio Borja Flores, 74. former sports writer (born 1935)
September 15: Espiridion Laxa, 79, incumbent chairman of film academy of the Philippines and film industry leader and pioneering independent film producer (born 1930)
October 7: Alecks Pabico, 42, Filipino journalist (Philippine Center for Investigative Journalism) (born April 19, 1967)
November 19: Johnny Delgado, 61, former actor and writer (born 1948)
November 21: Bernard Bonnin, 71, former actor (born 1938)
November 23: Victor Nuñez, 31, TV Reporter, UNTV 37 (born 1978)
December 16: Gennie Q. Jota, 74, Executive Director of Family Rosary Crusade (born 1936)
December 29: Mandy Saguin, 63, former TV host of Kaagapay and well known as "Super Doc" (born September 6, 1946)

See also
2009 in television

References

 
Television in the Philippines by year
Philippine television-related lists